Billy Snaddon (born 7 July 1969) is a Scottish former professional snooker player. He reached the World Snooker Championship first round five times, but never progressed past this stage. He spent 5 seasons ranked among the game's top 32, peaking at No. 24 in 2000.

Career
Snaddon began life as a footballer, but turned to snooker after a hip disease ended his football career, turning professional in 1991. He reached the last sixteen of seven ranking events before finally reaching a quarter-final, in the 1998 Irish Open.

He reached one ranking final in his thirteen-year career, in the 1999 Regal China International. A rank outsider in this tournament, he took out the top 16 players James Wattana, Ronnie O'Sullivan, Stephen Lee and Stephen Hendry en route to the final before losing 3–9 to World Champion John Higgins. Snaddon also reached the quarter-final of the Thailand Masters a year later.

In 2016, he won in both the team, and seniors individual, categories at the Blackball (pool) International World Championship.

Performance and rankings timeline

Career finals

Ranking finals: 1

Non-ranking finals: 1 (1 title)

References

External links

Profile on globalsnooker.co.uk

1969 births
Living people
Scottish snooker players